Shikhakeran may refer to:
Şıxakəran, Azerbaijan
Şiyəkəran, Azerbaijan